Conotrachelus aratus, the hickory shoot curculio, is a species of snout or bark beetle in the family Curculionidae. It is found in North America.

References

Further reading

 
 
 
 
 

Molytinae
Articles created by Qbugbot
Beetles described in 1824